Tom Walter is an American college baseball coach. He has been the head coach of Wake Forest since the start of the 2010 season.  Before coming to Wake Forest, Walter held head coaching positions at George Washington from 1997–2004 and New Orleans from 2005–2009.  He was an assistant at George Washington from 1992–1994.  Walter's career head coaching record, as of the end of the 2014 season, is 560–473.

Outside NCAA baseball, Walter served as the assistant general manager of the minor league Greensboro Bats from 1995–1996.  In collegiate summer baseball, Walter was the head coach of the Valley Baseball League's New Market Rebels in 1994 and the Cape Cod League's Cotuit Kettleers from 1997–1998.

Walter received national media attention prior to the 2011 season for donating his kidney to Wake Forest baseball player Kevin Jordan.  In his senior year of high school, Jordan had developed ANCA vasculitis, a condition that severely affected his kidneys.  After Jordan enrolled at Wake Forest in fall 2010, the condition did not improve, and by January 2011 he required a kidney transplant.  Since none of Jordan's family members qualified as a donor, Walter offered to be a kidney donor for Jordan.  The February 2011 operation was successful, and Jordan was able to start his baseball career for Wake Forest in spring 2012.

Head coaching record
Below is a table of Walter's yearly records as an NCAA head baseball coach.

See also
List of current NCAA Division I baseball coaches

References

Living people
Cape Cod Baseball League coaches
Georgetown Hoyas baseball players
George Washington University School of Business alumni
George Washington Colonials baseball coaches
New Orleans Privateers baseball coaches
Wake Forest Demon Deacons baseball coaches
Organ transplant donors
Year of birth missing (living people)
McDonough School of Business alumni